WWUH is a non-commercial radio station licensed to the University of Hartford in West Hartford, Connecticut, United States. The station was started on July 15, 1968 and has a Public Alternative Radio format.

WWUH operates on 91.3 MHz from a tower site in Avon, Connecticut, but their programming is also rebroadcast on WDJW (89.7 FM) in Somers, Connecticut. In addition, WWUH was the first station in the state of Connecticut to webcast on a regular basis via its website. WWUH has an extensive music library consisting of close to 140,000 LPs and CDs.

Notable alumni
 Mike Crispino (1980), Sports Commentator

See also
WDJW
Folk Next Door
List of community radio stations in the United States

References

External links
WWUH history
WWUH website

Avon, Connecticut
West Hartford, Connecticut
WUH
University of Hartford
WUH
Radio stations established in 1968
1968 establishments in Connecticut
Community radio stations in the United States